Bridgette Karen "Bridgett" Kern (born September 7, 1969), is an American worship musician and urban contemporary gospel recording artist. She started her music career, in 2002, and has released two studio album's.

Early and personal life
Kern was born Bridgette Karen Overstreet, on September 7, 1969, in Phoenix, Arizona, where she grew up singing in the Phoenix Mass Choir founded by Eddie James. She is married to a pastor, Dr. Joseph Kern, where they are both pastors of Radiant Life Church, and they have four children, Cierra, Caleb, Gabrielle, and Brandon.

Music career
Her music recording career started in 2002, with the studio album, Broken Spirit. The subsequent studio album, No One Greater, was released in 2015, from Dream Worship, a division of Dream Records.

Discography
Studio albums
 Broken Spirit (2002)
 No One Greater (2015, Dream Worship)

References

External links
Official website

1969 births
Living people
African-American songwriters
African-American Christians
Musicians from Phoenix, Arizona
Songwriters from Arizona
21st-century African-American people
20th-century African-American people